Millbrook, also known as Millbrook Village, is an unincorporated community located along Old Mine Road within Hardwick Township, formerly Pahaquarry Township, in Warren County, New Jersey, United States. It is named after the Mill Brook, now known as Van Campens Mill Brook, a tributary of the Delaware River. The area is now part of the Delaware Water Gap National Recreation Area.

History
A grist mill was built here in 1832, by Abram Garis, on what is now known as Van Campens Mill Brook. The George Trauger House was built . The Colonel Abraham Van Campen House, built , the B. B. Van Campen Farm, also known as the Moses Van Campen House, built , and the Miller House, also known as the James Van Campen Farm, are contributing properties of the Old Mine Road Historic District. The Abraham Van Campen House, built , was moved to the village in 1974.

Gallery

References

External links
 
 
 
 
 

Hardwick Township, New Jersey
Unincorporated communities in Warren County, New Jersey
Unincorporated communities in New Jersey
Delaware Water Gap National Recreation Area